Blacksmiths is a coastal suburb of the City of Lake Macquarie in New South Wales, Australia adjacent to the Pacific Ocean  south of Newcastle's central business district, between the suburbs of Belmont and Swansea

Facilities
Within Blacksmiths are Blacksmiths Beach and the southern section of Nine Mile Beach, the Blacksmiths Nature Reserve, a primary school, soccer club and caravan park.

References

External links
 History of Blacksmiths (Lake Macquarie City Library)

Suburbs of Lake Macquarie
Populated places established in 1948
1948 establishments in Australia